Pyromellitic dianhydride (PMDA) is an organic compound with the formula C6H2(C2O3)2.  It is the double carboxylic acid anhydride that is used in the preparation of polyimide polymers such as Kapton.  It is a white, hygroscopic solid.  It forms a hydrate.

Preparation
It is prepared by gas-phase oxidation of 1,2,4,5-tetramethylbenzene (or related tetrasubstituted benzene derivatives).  An idealized equation is:
C6H2(CH3)4  +  6 O2  →    C6H2(C2O3)2  +  6 H2O
In the laboratory, it can be prepared by dehydration of pyromellitic acid using acetic anhydride.

Reactions

PMDA is an electron-acceptor, forming a variety of charge-transfer complexes.  It reacts with amines to diimides, C6H2[(CO)2NR]2 which also have acceptor properties.

Applications
PMDA is used in PET bottle recycling as a 'chain extender'. It increases the molecular weight of the polymer by linking-together alcohol and carboxylic acid groups formed by hydrolysis of the PET. This improves the rheological properties and overall quality of the recycled plastic.

Safety
Evidence suggests that PMDA causes occupational asthma.

References

Phthalic anhydrides